The following lists events that happened during 2016 in Turkey.

Incumbents
Recep Tayyip Erdoğan, President, 2014–current
Ahmet Davutoğlu, Prime Minister, 2014–2016 
Binali Yıldırım, Prime Minister, 2016–2018

Events
PKK rebellion (2015–present), 24 July 2015–current
Turkey–ISIL conflict, 11 May 2013–current

January
12 January – At least ten people were killed and 15 were injured following an explosion in Istanbul's Sultanahmet Square. A suicide bomber was reported to be responsible.
14 January – PKK rebels bombed police headquarters in Cinar, Diyarbakır, killing five people and injuring another 39.
27 January – .istanbul and .ist have begun to be used as domain names on the approved Internet.
30 January – Bakırköy; Picasso's previously stolen "Naked Woman Scanning" the table named by the police found.

February

17 February – 28 people were killed in a car bombing in Ankara.

March
4 March – The Turkish government seized control of the "Zaman" journal.
13 March – 37 people were killed in a car bombing in Ankara.
19 March – 5 people were killed in a suicide bombing in Istanbul. 
20 March – 20 March – 2015–16 Super League season 26th in the Turk Telekom Arena sport club Galatasaray – Fenerbahçe need to be played between the derby match for safety reasons due to the start of the game was delayed to stay 2 hours.

April
10 April – Vodafone Arena was opened.
23 - 30 October – the international exhibition organization Expo 2016 was held in Antalya.

May
1 May – In Gaziantep, ISIS militia organized a live bomb suicide attack. 3 policemen killed, 23 civilian injured.

June
7 June – A bombed attack took place in Istanbul's Fatih district by ISIS.
17 June - The Istanbul government bans pride marches in the city of Istanbul. The Ban has been in place as of 2023.
28 June – The attack of the armed and bombed Atatürk Airport took place by ISIS.

July

1 July – The world's fourth longest span suspension bridge "Osman Gazi Bridge" was opened to service.
15 July – Within the Turkish Armed Forces a military failed coup d'état attempt was made by a group of soldiers who defined themselves as the Peace at Home Council. Anti-coup protests have been held in many provinces of Turkey. The coup attempt in Turkey was declared a state of emergency for 3 months. It was a catch-up decision against the alleged coup plotters and the coup plotters.

August
24 August – Turkey has launched a cross border operation with Jarabulus under the code name "Operation Euphrates Shield". The region was cleared by ISIS and handed over to the Syrian National Army.
27 August – Yavuz Sultan Selim Bridge opened to service.

October
5 October – 9 October – 2016 Extreme Sailing Series in Istanbul.

Deaths

January 
January 2 – Sabri Yirmibeşoğlu, Turkish soldier (born 1928)
January 3 – Halis Toprak, a Turkish businessman
January 4 – Sedat Üründül, Turkish businessman
January 5 – Önol Şakar, Turkish politician 
January 7 – Remzi Evren, Turkish cinematographer 
January 14 – Şefik Döğen, Turkish actor
January 21 – Mustafa Vehbi Koç, Turkish businessman (born 1960)
January 22 – Kamer Genç, Turkish politician (born 1940)

February 
February 23 – Tosun Terzioğlu, Former President of TÜBİTAK (born 1942)

April 
April 20 – Attila Özdemiroğlu, Turkish composer and singer (born 1943)

May 
May 15 – Oya Aydoğan, Turkish cinematographer (d 1957)

July 
July 7 – Turgay Şeren, Turkish Football Player and Former Technical Director (born 1932)
July 25 – Halil İnalcık, Turkish historian, history professor (born 1916)

August 
August 23 – İsrafil Köse, Turkish actress (born 1970)
August 29 – Vedat Türkali, Turkish writer (born 1919)
August 30 – Naşide Göktürk, Turkish composer, writer and commentator (born 1965)

September
September 8 – Arif Ahmet Denizolgun, 55. Minister of Transport of the Turkish Government (born 1955)
September 16 – Tarık Akan, Turkish cinema and serial player (born 1949)

October
October 12 – Kemal Unakıtan – Turkish politician (born 1946)
October 20 – Altemur Kılıç – Turkish journalist and writer (born 1924)
October 26 – Nail Güreli – Turkish journalist and writer (born 1932)

November
November 2 – Korkut Özal, Turkish politician (born 1929)
November 2 – Gönül Ülkü Özcan, Turkish cinema theater and series player (born 1931)
November 2 – Mete Akyol, Turkish journalist (born 1935)
November 30 – Erdal Tosun – Turkish actor (born 1963)

See also
2016 in Turkish television
List of Turkish films of 2016

References

 
Turkey
2010s in Turkey
Years of the 21st century in Turkey
Turkey
Turkey